Gabriel Daniel Popa (born 27 August 1985) is a Romanian former footballer who played as a goalkeeper for Dunărea Călărași and Astra Ploiești.

Honours
Dunărea Călărași
Liga II: 2017–18
Liga III: 2014–15

External links
 

1985 births
Living people
People from Călărași
Romanian footballers
Association football goalkeepers
Liga I players
Liga II players
FC Dunărea Călărași players
FC Astra Giurgiu players